is a 1954 Japanese drama film directed by Mikio Naruse. It is based on the novel The Sound of the Mountain by Nobel Prize winner Yasunari Kawabata.

Plot
Shingo, an aging businessman, sees the marriage of his son Shuichi and his daughter-in-law Kikuko, who live in the same household, fall apart due to Shuichi's coldness and adulterous behaviour. Flattered by Kikuko's overt adoration for him, he tries to act as a cornerstone for her. His own daughter Fusako, who left her husband and moved back into her parents' home with her children, blames Shingo for her arranged and failed marriage and for his preference of Kikuko over her. Shingo accompanies Kikuko to a hospital visit, only to learn later that she aborted the child she expected from Shuichi. A secretary from Shingo's company helps him to find Kinu, Shuichi's mistress and an independent businesswoman, who tells him of his son's abusive behaviour. Kikuko finally decides to divorce her husband and, meeting Shingo in a park, tells her father-in-law that she wants to try to live a life on her own.

Cast
 Setsuko Hara as Kikuko Ogata
 Sō Yamamura as Shingo Ogata
 Ken Uehara as Shuichi Ogata
 Yōko Sugi as Hideko Tanizaki
 Teruko Nagaoka as Yasuko
 Yasuko Tan'ami as Ikeda
 Chieko Nakakita as Fusako Aihara
 Rieko Sumi as Kinuko (Kinu)

Legacy
Naruse biographer Catherine Russell sees Sound of the Mountain as a woman's film, as it reduces the book's perspective of Shingo in favour of the female characters who, with the exception of the passive Kikuko, act outspoken and independently, "trying to make their way in a world in which men like Shuichi have been psychologically destroyed by the war". The last scene suggests the possibility of change for Kikuko, achieving a positive resolution of her problems.

Naruse himself declared Sound of the Mountain one of his favourites of his films.

References

External links
 
 
 

1954 films
1954 drama films
Japanese drama films
Japanese black-and-white films
Films based on Japanese novels
Films based on works by Yasunari Kawabata
Toho films
Films directed by Mikio Naruse
Films produced by Sanezumi Fujimoto
Films scored by Ichirō Saitō
1950s Japanese films